Werner Risi (born 15 July 1940) is a Swiss former swimmer. He competed in the men's 200 metre breaststroke at the 1960 Summer Olympics.

References

External links
 

1940 births
Living people
Olympic swimmers of Switzerland
Swimmers at the 1960 Summer Olympics
Sportspeople from Basel-Stadt
Swiss male breaststroke swimmers
20th-century Swiss people